Astragalus eriopodus is a species of milkvetch in the family Fabaceae.

References

eriopodus
Taxa named by Pierre Edmond Boissier